The London Lords were a Canadian football team of the 1950s, 1960s and early 1970s, from London, Ontario. They played their home games at Labatt Park. They won the last Ontario Rugby Football Union Senior championship in 1960, and then continued to play ORFU Intermediate football until the league folded.

The Lords were a farm team for the Hamilton Tiger-Cats, with the Tiger-Cats having first refusal on call-up/contracts on any London Lords' player. 

The 1957 lost final was a particularly crushing disappointment for the Lords. Although entering the 2-way final as the underdogs, having lost both of their regular season games to the Kitchener-Waterloo Dutchmen, the Lords stormed the first game 42–6. They also gained an early lead at the return leg, before conceding 48 points in 45 minutes.

In 2013 the name "London Lords" was adopted by the former London Silverbacks.  The team played in World Minor League Football, which ceased to operate in 2015.

ORFU season-by-season

References

Sports teams in London, Ontario
Ontario Rugby Football Union teams
Canadian football teams in Ontario
Defunct Canadian football teams